Bitter Creek is a tributary of the White River in Utah.

References

Rivers of Utah